The M.Zuiko Digital ED 40–150mm 2.8 PRO is a professional telephoto zoom lens made by Olympus for the Micro Four Thirds system. It is the first telephoto lens in the Olympus M.Zuiko PRO range, which features weather-sealed, metal construction and high-performance optics intended to accompany the higher-end weather-sealed Olympus OM-D bodies such as the E-M1 Mark II. The lens features an integrated lens function button (configurable on the camera) and manual-focus clutch, and ships with a tripod collar and collapsible lens hood.

Comparison 
Compared to other camera systems with different normal focal lengths, and therefore, different image sensor sizes, the following equivalent values apply to lenses with appropriate properties as the M.Zuiko 40–150 mm 2.8 PRO within the Micro Four Thirds system (MFT). With the parameters given in the table in all camera systems the photographer will get a similar angle of view, depth of field, diffraction limitation and motion blur (see also Micro Four Thirds system / Equivalents):

External links 

 Olympus Asia product page
 Olympus America product page
 Four Thirds consortium specifications

References

40-150mm f 2.8 PRO
Camera lenses introduced in 2014